Galanga is a genus of cicadas in the family Cicadidae. There is at least one described species in Galanga, G. labeculata.

References

Further reading

 
 
 
 

Cicadettini
Cicadidae genera